Lana Myers is a justice of the Fifth Court of Appeals of Texas Place 4. She was appointed to this position in December 2009 by Governor Rick Perry. Prior to her appointment, Myers had served as an elected Judge presiding over the Dallas County 203rd criminal court. Prior to that position, she was the Dallas County Assistant District Attorney, a position which she held for 12 years before resigning to run for election to the criminal court.

STAR Court initiative 
"In addition to her regular docket, Judge Myers has served the community through her involvement in administering and judging the Texas and National High School Mock Trial Competitions. She has also received special recognition for her work in presiding over STAR Court (an acronym for "Strengthening Transition And Recovery"), an innovative specialty court designed to reduce recidivism among female offenders charged with felony prostitution.".

Myers was interviewed by The Atlantic, to discuss the STAR court initiative and her experience with the program.

References

External links 
 Official site

Texas state court judges
Living people
American women judges
Year of birth missing (living people)
21st-century American women